Bucculatrix rhamniella is a moth in the family Bucculatricidae. It was described by Gottlieb August Wilhelm Herrich-Schäffer in 1855. It is found in Poland, the Baltic region, Hungary and Romania. A record from the Netherlands is based on a misidentification.

The wingspan is 10–11 mm. There are usually two generations per year.

The larvae feed on Rhamnus catharticus and Rhamnus pumilis. They mine the leaves of their host plant. The mine has the form of a slender corridor. Older larvae live freely on the leaf, causing window feeding. Larvae can be found in mid-July. The species overwinters in the pupal stage.

References

Bucculatricidae
Moths described in 1855
Taxa named by Gottlieb August Wilhelm Herrich-Schäffer
Moths of Europe